Kalaharia may refer to:

Kalahari Craton, a geological phenomenon
Kalaharia (plant), a genus of plants in the family Lamiaceae